Interzone is a German blues/rock/heavy metal band from the early 1980s, headed by vocalist Heiner Pudelko. 

German rock musicians